The Navy Distinguished Public Service Award, established in 1951, is an award presented by the U.S. Secretary of the Navy  to civilians for specific courageous or heroic acts or exceptionally outstanding service of substantial and long-term benefit to the Navy, Marine Corps, or Department of the Navy as a whole. Originally a certificate with a lapel pin, the medal was first presented in July 1951. It is the highest recognition that the Secretary of the Navy may pay to a civilian not employed by the Department of the Navy.

Design
The medal, designed by the United States Mint, is gold in color. The obverse has the Seal of the Navy Department, encircled by the inscription above "Department of the Navy" and below, "United States of America." The reverse has the words "Awarded to" with a blank tablet for inscription of the recipient's name, resting on a spray of laurel. Arched at the top rim of the reverse of the medal is the word "Distinguished." Horizontally, below the tablet, is the word "Public" and arched along the bottom rim is the word "Service." The medal is suspended by a ribbon using the colors of the United States Navy, half blue on the left, and half golden-yellow on the right. In addition to the medal it consists of a miniature medal, lapel bar, rosette, and a certificate signed by the Secretary of the Navy.

Notable recipients

Notable recipients include Joe Rosenthal, Pulitzer Prize winning photographer, known for the iconic photo, Raising the Flag on Iwo Jima.

Sybil Stockdale, wife of the late Vice Admiral James Stockdale, was honored with the award for her work to publicize the mistreatment of POWs and campaign for their families during the Vietnam War. She co-founded the National League of Families. She is the only wife of an active-duty officer ever to have received this award.

Cinematographer Christopher Jackson received the award for rescuing Marine Corps Sgt Courtney Rauch from a burning Humvee in the Helmand Province of Afghanistan in August 2008. While filming for LtCol (Ret) Oliver North’s show on the Fox News Channel, the Humvee in which Jackson and Rauch were riding was struck by an IED, knocking Sgt Rauch unconscious. Although injured in the blast, Jackson pulled Rauch from the vehicle to safety. MajGen Paul Lefebvre presented Jackson with the award January 24, 2009, at Al Faw Palace in Baghdad, Iraq.

The late former Rep. John Murtha (D-Pa) received the award in 2009 for his “courageous leadership, vision, and loyalty to the men and women of the Department of the Navy." At the time of his award Murtha was the influential chairman of the House Appropriations Committee’s Defense Subcommittee.

Rep. Rodney Frelinghuysen (R-NJ) received the award in 2013. Frelinghuysen, also a sitting member of the Defense Subcommittee, was recognized for his "long and selfless service to the nation’s sailors and Marines [that] ensured they were provided the resources necessary to support and defend the nation’s interests around the globe."

Capt. John “GiddyUp” Bunch received the award in 2018. Bunch was honored for his timeless devotion and support of US Navy & US Marines returning from combat from 2005 to present day. 3,993 US Troops have received free R&R’s, 103 free weddings, Same Day PTSD Counseling, and direct assistance with The Fallen. Bunch was also awarded The Army Outstanding Civilian Service Medal. Total benefits exceed 18.3 Million Dollars. Bunch, a US Marine Officer served from 1969-1976.

See also 

 Percy Spencer
 Tom Hanks

References

External links

This article incorporates text in the public domain from the United States Government.

Awards and decorations of the United States Department of Defense
Awards established in 1951
Distinguished service awards
1951 establishments in the United States